Mytown was an Irish boy band formed in 1996 by members Danny O'Donoghue, Dermot Browne (World's Apart), Mark Sheehan, Terry Daly and Paul Walker. They released one album, the epomynous Mytown and had a number of singles before splitting up in 2001, however Browne left before then after a falling out with Louis Walsh citing irreconcilable differences. Two of the prominent members of the band, namely Danny O'Donoghue and Mark Sheehan, went on to form the pop rock band The Script alongside Glen Power. The band members co-wrote their debut album.

Background 
The band was first established in 1996. Tony Dunne was friends with Louis Walsh who put him in touch with Paul Walker, and Dermot Browne. After a few meetings, Dunne, Walker and Browne recruited Mark Sheehan, who at the time was teaching hip-hop dancing at the now defunct Digges Lane performing arts school in Dublin. After Sheehan introduced his friend Terry Daly to Walsh and Walker, they decided that he would be perfect for the band. After touring around Ireland and England, they played a showcase at the Mobius TV Studios, owned by Eamonn Maguire who was an old friend of Sheehan's. Maguire started to manage the band and after a short time had mortgaged his house, left his position as C.E.O. of The Mobius Group and started managing the band full-time. Maguire secured a coveted showcase at the EAT'M Conference in Las Vegas and in May 1998 the band flew there for a successful showcase at the MGM Grand. Their lawyer who was one of the most influential music attorneys, Ken Hertz, along with Maguire, began negotiating one of the biggest deals in pop history for a new band. After the showcase in Las Vegas, the band flew back to Dublin where Tony Dunne was asked to leave the band and Sheehan introduced a friend of his, Danny O'Donoghue, to Maguire. Within a week of this meeting, O'Donoghue had joined the band and they flew to New York for their second showcase where they played for the famous Doug Morris, who turned to Maguire halfway through the first song and said "Welcome to the Universal Family". This was the start of the recording career of Mytown.

Shortly after the band was signed to Universal Records, they began harmonising and writing songs together. Their debut single, "Do It Like This", was released in Ireland in March 1997 to moderate success. They began writing their debut album with several well-known producers, including Teddy Riley, Rick Nowels, Billy Steinberg, Wanya Morris of Boyz II Men, and Andy Whitmore. Apart from the two cover versions, the entire set of their debut album was co-written by Sheehan, Daly and O'Donoghue, and Eamonn Maguire served as executive producer. In 1999, the band began promoting the album, releasing the single "Body Bumpin'" in the United States, the second single "Now That I Found You" in the United States and Australia, and "Party All Night", which was released worldwide. Although the album was planned for release worldwide, both the British and Irish releases never saw the light of day due to an internal struggle within Universal Records in the US. When Cherry Entertainment was dropped as a label on Universal, Mytown were released from their contract and the band decided to pursue their own individual paths. Years later, Sheehan and O'Donoghue met drummer Glen Power, and The Script was born.

Discography

Albums

Singles 
1997: "Do It Like This" (Ireland only release)
1999: "Party All Night" (UK #22)
1999: "Body Bumpin'"
2000: "Now That I Found You"
2000: "Party All Night" (re-release)

References 

Irish boy bands
1996 establishments in Ireland
2001 disestablishments in Ireland
Musical groups established in 1996
Musical groups disestablished in 2001
The Script